NYAS may stand for:

 The New York Academy of Sciences
 National Youth Advocacy Service, a UK charity providing socio-legal services
 New York Auto Show